Georges Simon Favon (2 February 1843, in Plainpalais – 17 May 1902) was a Swiss politician and President of the Swiss National Council (1884).

Boulevard Georges-Favon in Geneva is named for him.

External links 
 
 

1843 births
1902 deaths
Politicians from Geneva
Free Democratic Party of Switzerland politicians
Members of the Council of States (Switzerland)
Members of the National Council (Switzerland)
Presidents of the National Council (Switzerland)